Crooked Creek is a stream in the U.S. state of Iowa. It is a tributary to the Iowa River.

Crooked Creek was so named on account of its crooked meanders.

References

Rivers of Johnson County, Iowa
Rivers of Iowa